Catalina Sky Survey (CSS; obs. code: 703) is an astronomical survey to discover comets and asteroids. It is conducted at the Steward Observatory's Catalina Station, located near Tucson, Arizona, in the United States.

CSS focuses on the search for near-Earth objects, in particular on any potentially hazardous asteroid that may pose a threat of impact. Its counterpart in the southern hemisphere was the Siding Spring Survey (SSS), closed in 2013 due to loss of funding. CSS supersedes the photographic Bigelow Sky Survey.

Mission 

The NEO Observations Program is a result of a United States 1998 congressional directive to NASA to begin a program to identify  or larger objects to around 90 percent confidence level or better. The Catalina Sky Survey, located at the Mount Lemmon Observatory in the Catalina Mountains north of Tucson, carries out searches for near-earth objects, NEOs, contributing to the congressionally mandated goal.

In addition to identifying impact risks, the project also obtains other scientific information, including: improving the known population distribution in the main belt, finding the cometary distribution at larger perihelion distances, determining the distribution of NEOs as a product of collisional history and transport to the inner Solar System, and identifying potential targets for flight projects.

Techniques 
The Catalina Sky Survey (CSS) uses three telescopes, a  f/1.6 telescope on the peak of Mount Lemmon (MPC code G96), a  f/ 1.7 Schmidt telescope near Mount Bigelow (MPC code 703), and a  f/2.6 follow-up telescope also on Mount Lemmon (MPC code I52). The three telescopes are located in the Santa Catalina Mountains near Tucson, Arizona. The CSS southern hemisphere counterpart, the Siding Spring Survey (SSS), used a  f/3 Uppsala Schmidt telescope at Siding Spring Observatory in Australia. The 1.5 meter and 68 cm survey telescopes use identical, thermo-electrically cooled cameras and common software written by the CSS team. The cameras are cooled to approximately  so their dark current is about 1 electron per hour. These 10,560 x 10,560 pixel cameras provide a field of view of 5 square degrees with the 1.5-m telescope and nearly 20 square degrees with the Catalina Schmidt. Nominal exposures are 30 seconds and the 1.5-m can reach objects fainter than 21.5 V in that time. The 1 meter follow-up telescope uses a 2k x 2k CCD detector which provides a field of view of 0.3 square degrees. Starting 2019, CSS started using the  Kuiper telescope situated on Mt. Bigelow for targeted follow-up for 7–12 nights per lunation.

CSS typically operates every clear night with the exception of a few nights centered on the full moon. The southern hemispheres' SSS in Australia ended in 2013 after funding was discontinued.

Discoveries 

In 2005, CSS became the most prolific NEO survey surpassing Lincoln Near-Earth Asteroid Research (LINEAR) in total number of NEOs and potentially hazardous asteroids discovered each year since. As of 2020, the Catalina Sky Survey is responsible for the discovery of 47% of the total known NEO population. CSS discovered 310 NEOs in 2005, 396 in 2006, 466 in 2007, 564 in 2008, 573 in 2009, 607 in 2010, 572 in 2011, 626 in 2012, 600 in 2013, 616 in 2014, 576 in 2015, 929 in 2016, 989 in 2017, 1054 in 2018, and in 2019, 1067 NEOs were found.

Notable discoveries

List of discovered minor planets 

For a complete listing of all minor planets discovered by the Catalina Sky Survey, see the index section in list of minor planets.

CSS/SSS team 
The CSS team is headed by Eric Christensen of the Lunar and Planetary Laboratory of the University of Arizona.

The full CSS team is:

 Eric J. Christensen (principal investigator)
 Gregory Farneth
 Stephen M. Larson
 Alex R. Gibbs
 Albert D. Grauer
 Richard E. Hill (Retired)
 Richard A. Kowalski
 Joshua Hogan
 Hannes Gröller
 Frank Shelly
 David Rankin
 D. Carson Fuls
 Gregory J. Leonard
 Rob Seaman
 Theodore Pruyne
 Kacper Wierzchos

SSS 
 Robert H. McNaught
 Gordon J. Garradd

Educational outreach 
The CSS has helped with Astronomy Camp showing campers how they detect NEOs. They even played a role in an astrophotography exercise with the 2006 Adult Astronomy Camp ending up with a picture that was featured on Astronomy Picture of the Day.

Catalina Outer Solar System Survey 
The Zooniverse project Catalina Outer Solar System Survey is a citizen science project and it is listed as a NASA citizen science project. In this project, the volunteers search for trans-Neptunian objects (TNOs) in pre-processed images of the Catalina Sky Survey. Computers can detect the motion of TNOs, but humans have to check if this motion is real. Upon agreement with the volunteers, they will be cited as "measurers" in the submission of the astrometry to the Minor Planet Center.

See also 

 Asteroid Zoo
 Astronomical survey
 Large Synoptic Survey Telescope
 Minor Planet Center (MPC)
 Planetary Data System (PDS)
 Spaceguard
 Asteroid Terrestrial-impact Last Alert System
 List of near-Earth object observation projects

References

External links 
 Catalina Sky Survey Website
 Overview and history

Astronomical surveys
Discoverers of asteroids
Near-Earth object tracking
Discoveries by the Catalina Sky Survey